Terence Donovan may refer to:

Terence Donovan, Baron Donovan (1898–1971), British Labour Party Member of Parliament, 1945–1950, Law Lord, 1964–1971
Terence Donovan (actor) (born 1942), English-Australian actor, and father of actor/singer Jason Donovan
Terence Donovan (photographer) (1936–1996), English photographer and film director

Terry Donovan may refer to:

Terry Donovan (footballer) (born 1958), Irish footballer
Terry Donovan (businessman), co-founder of Rockstar Games
Terry Donovan (archer) (born 1944), Australian Olympic archer